Gemünden is a municipality in the Vogelsbergkreis in Hesse, Germany.

Geography

Location
Gemünden lies on the rivers Felda and Ohm, flowing from the Vogelsberg Mountains in the region of Upper Hessen (Oberhessen) amongst Homberg Grünberg, Kirtorf, Romrod and Feldatal, or more broadly, between Gießen and Bad Hersfeld. Through the rural areas within the community runs the Autobahn A 5

Neighbouring communities
Gemuenden borders in the northwest on the town of Homberg, in the northeast on the town of Kirtorf, in the east on the town of Romrod, in the southeast on the community of Feldatal, and in the southwest on the community of Mücke.

Constituent communities
The community of Gemünden consists of 7 centres that were amalgamated as part of municipal reforms in 1971 into one greater community. These are:

 Burg-Gemünden
 Ehringshausen
 Elpenrod
 Hainbach
 Nieder-Gemünden (administrative seat)
 Otterbach
 Rülfenrod

Politics

Municipal council

The municipal elections on 26 March 2006 yielded the following results:

 SPD 8 seats
 UBL (citizens' coalition)  8 seats
 BGG (citizens' coalition) 7 seats

References

Vogelsbergkreis
Grand Duchy of Hesse